A clinic is a public health facility.

Clinic may also refer to:

Medical care 
 Polyclinic and policlinic, types of health center

Arts, entertainment, and media

Films 
 The Clinic (1982 film), a 1982 Australian film
 The Clinic (2004 film), a 2004 TV film starring Jonathan Scarfe
 The Clinic (2010 film), a 2010 Australian film

Music

Groups and labels 
 Clinic (band), an English indie rock band
 Clinic, a band featuring Canadian musician Philip Brigham

Other music 
 Clinic (album), an album by that band
 Clinic (music), in music an informal meeting with a guest musician, where a small - to medium-sized audience questions the appearing musician's particular styles and techniques

Television 
  The Clinic (1995 TV series), a 1995 spoof of medical dramas, produced by Brandon Tartikoff
 The Clinic (TV series), an Irish drama

Other arts, entertainment, and media 
 The Clinic (game), a party game by Winning Moves UK
 The Clinic (newspaper), a Chilean newspaper

Other uses 
 the Catholic Legal Immigration Network, Inc. (CLINIC) - network of non-profit immigration program

See also 
 
 
 Klinik, a Belgian industrial band